All Nepal Democratic Youth Association (abbreviated अनेजयु संघ, anejayu sangh) is a political youth movement in Nepal, the youth wing of Rastriya Janamorcha. The 6th national congress of ANDYA was held in Dhulikhel, February 2007.

References

Youth wings of political parties in Nepal
Youth wings of communist parties